A list of all windmills and windmill sites which lie in the current ceremonial county of Suffolk.

Locations

A

B

C

D

E

F

G

H

I

K

L

M
For Minsmere see Leiston

N

O

P

R

S
For Saxtead Green see FramlinghamFor Sizewell see Leiston
{| class="wikitable"
|-
! Location
! Name of mill andgrid reference
! Type
! Maps
! First mentionor built
! Last mention or demise
! Photograph
|-
| Sapiston
| Approximately
| Post
| 1736
| 1736
| Moved 1853
| 
|-
| Saxmundham
| 
| 
| 
| 1767
| 1767
| 
|-
| Saxmundham
| 
| Post
| 1824
| 1824
| Demolished March 1907Windmill World
| 
|-
| Shadingfield
| 
| Post
| 1764
| 1764
| Demolished c. 1905
| 
|-
| Shadingfield
| 
| Smock
| 
| c. 1840
| Demolished c. 1938
| 
|-
| Shimpling
| Approximately
| Post
| 1783
| 1783
| 1783
| 
|-
| Shimpling
| Mill Hill Mill
| Post
| 1783
| 1783
| Moved to Alpheton c. 1875
| 
|-
| Shimpling
| The Street
| Smock
| 
| 1792
| Demolished 1935Windmill World
| 
|-
| Shotley
| 
| Post
| 
| 1730
| 1730
| 
|-
| Shotley
| 
| Tower
| 1826
| 1826
| Demolished early 1930s
| 
|-
| Shottisham
| 
| Post
| 1838
| 1838
| 1838
| 
|-
| Sibton
| 
| Post
| 1736
| 1736
| Demolished c. 1922 - Roundhouse remains Windmill World

| 
|-
| Snape
| Turning Mill
| 
| 
| c. 1828
| 
| 
|-
| Snape
| Markin's Mill
| Post
| 1824
| 1824
| Demolished 1922
| 
|-
| Snape
| 
| Post
| 
| 1668
| Demolished c. 1797
| 
|-
| Snape
| Hudson's Mill
| 
| 1797
| Demolished July 1933Windmill World
| 
|-
| Somerleyton
| 
| Post
| 1783
| 1783
| Demolished c. 1880
| 
|-
| Somerleyton
| 
| Tower
| 1837
| 1837
| Demolished early 20th century
| 
|-
| Somersham
| 
| Post
| 
| 1811
| 1881
| 
|-
| Sotterley
| Hulver Street Mill
| Post
| 1736
| 1736
| Gone by 1914
| 
|-
| Sotterley
| Sotterley Brickworks
| 
| 1883
| 1883
| Gone by 1903
| 
|-
| Southwold
| White MillTown MillCorporation Mill
| Post
| 
| 1723
| 1723
| 
|-
| Southwold
| Black Mill
| Post
| 
| 1798
| Wrecked in gale November 1863
| 
|-
| Southwold
| Black MillGreat Mill
| Post
| 
| 1864| Demolished 1894
| 
|-
| Southwold
| Baggott's Mill
| Post
| 
| 1841
| Burnt down 1876
| 
|-
| Southwold
| Salt works
| Hollow Post
| 
| 
| 1938
| 
|-
| Southwold
| Southwold Common
| Titt iron wind engine
| 
| c. 1886
| 1938
| 
|-
| Stansfield
| 
| 
| 1783
| 1783
| Demolished 1840
| 
|-
| Stansfield
| Stansfield Mill
| Tower
| 
| 1840
| Windmill World
| 
|-
| Stanstead
| 
| Post
| 1799
| 1799
| Blown down c. 1915
| 
|-
| Stanton
| 
| 
| 
| 1393
| 1394
| 
|-
| Stanton
| Bury Lane Mill
| Post
| 1824
| 1824
| 1882
| 
|-
| Stanton
| Upthorpe Mill
| Post
| 
| 1751
| Windmill World
| 
|-
| Stanton
| 
| Smock
| 1764
| 1764
| Demolished 1940s
| 
|-
| Stanton
| Stanton Chair MillGeorge Hill Mill
| Post
| 
| 1824
| 1915Windmill World
| 
|-
| Stanton
| Lower Mill
| 
| 
| 
| Moved 1818
| 
|-
| St Cross, South Elmham
| Sancroft Mill
| 
| 1826
| 1826
| Gone by 1883
| 
|-
| St James, South Elmham
| 
| Post
| 
| 1864
| Demolished June 1923Windmill World
| 
|-
| St Michael, South Elmham
| 
| Post
| 
| 1799
| Demolished 1955 or 1956
| 
|-
| (one of the South Elmhams)
| 
| Post
| 
| 
| Moved to Fressingfield 1792
| 
|-
| Stoke Ash
| 
| Post
| 1764
| 1764
| Burnt down 1883
| 
|-
| Stoke by Clare
| Approximately
| 
| 1783
| 1783
| 1783
| 
|-
| Stoke by Clare
| 
| Tower
| 1824
| 1824
| Demolished c. 1890
| 
|-
| Stoke by Clare
| 
| Post
| 1824
| 1824
| Demolished 1892
| 
|-
| Stoke by Nayland
| 
| 
| 
| 
| 1884
| 
|-
| Stoke by Nayland
| Approximately
| 
| 1783
| 1783
| 1783
| 
|-
| Stoke by Nayland
| Withermarsh Green Mill
| Post
| 1824
| 1824
| Moved to Polstead c. 1875
| 
|-
| Stonham Aspal
| Mill Green Mill
| Post
| 1826
| 1826
| Demolished 1909
| 
|-
| Stowmarket
| (two mills south of the town)
| 
| 1675
| 1675
| 1675
| 
|-
| Stowmarket
| 
| Post| 1824
| 1824
| Gone by 1884
| 
|-
| Stowmarket
| 
| Post
| 1824
| 1824
| 1903
| 
|-
| Stowmarket
| 
| Post
| 1824
| 1824
| 1903
| 
|-
| Stowmarket
| Fison's Mill
| Smock
| 1824
| 1824
| Burnt down 1884
| 
|-
| Stowmarket
| Eastbridge Windpump
| Smock
| 
| 1979
| 
| 
|-
| Stowupland
| Approximately
| Post
| 
| 
| 
| 
|-
| Stowupland
| Mill Street Millapproximately
| 
| 
| 
| 
| 
|-
| Stowupland
| 
| Post
| 
| 1802
| Demolished 1866
| 
|-
| Stowupland
| Stowupland Green Mill
| Tower
| 1824
| 1824
| Demolished 1919
| 
|-
| Stradbroke
| Battlesea Green Mill
| Post
| 1813
| 1813
| Burnt down 1898
| 
|-
| Stradbroke
| Barley Green Mill
| Post
| 
| c. 1704
| Demolished 1941Windmill World
| 
|-
| Stradbroke
| Skinner's Mill
| Post
| 
| 1688
| Demolished 1941 or 1942
| 
|-
| Stratford St Andrew
| 
| Post
| 1824
| 1824
| Demolished 1905 or 1906Windmill World
| 
|-
| Sudbury
| Approximately
| Post
| 
| 1614
| 1714
| 
|-
| Sudbury
| 
| Post
| 1805
| 1805
| Moved to Assington 1868
| 
|-
| Sudbury
| 
| Tower
| 1824
| 1824
| 1824
| 
|-
| Sudbury
| 
| Tower
| 1824
| 1824
| 1824
| 
|-
| Sudbury
| Highfield Mill
| Smock
| 
| 1855
| Demolished 1919
| 
|-
| Sutton
| 
| Post
| 1838
| 1838
| Blown down c. 1916
| 
|-
| Swefling
| Girling's Mill
| Post
| 
| 1775
| Demolished September 1935Windmill World
| 
|-
| Swefling
| Middle Mill
| Post
| 1783
| 1783
| 1900, demolished 1900s
| 
|-
| Swefling
| High MillRachael
| Post
| 1783
| 1783
| Demolished 1911 or 1912Windmill World
| 
|-
| Swilland
| 
| Post
| 1824
| 1824
| Demolished c. 1953Windmill World
| 
|-
| Syleham
| Syleham Mill
| Post
| 
| 1823
| Blown down 16 October 1987Windmill World
| 
|}

T, U

W, Y

Mill bodies

A number of post mill bucks, and one smock mill body were moved and re-erected after they had ceased to be used as windmills.

Locations formerly within Suffolk
For mills in Belton, Bradwell, Burgh Castle, Cobholm and Southtown see List of windmills in Norfolk.
For mills in Fritton see List of drainage windmills in Norfolk.

Maps
1588 Anonymous
1675 Ogilby
1724 John Warburton, Joseph Bland & Payler Smith
1736 John Kirby
1777John Chapman & Peter André
1783 Joseph Hodgkinson
1825 C & J Greenwood
1826 Andrew Bryant
1837 Ordnance Survey
1838 Ordnance Survey
1883 Ordnance Survey

Notes

Mills in bold are still standing, known building dates are indicated in bold. Text in italics'' denotes indicates that the information is not confirmed, but is likely to be the case stated.

Sources
Unless otherwise indicated, the source for all entries is '''

References

External links
 Suffolk Mills Group

History of Suffolk

Lists of windmills in England
Windmilles